Heliothinae is a small, cosmopolitan subfamily of moths in the family Noctuidae, with about 400 described species worldwide. It includes a number of economically significant agricultural pest species, such as Helicoverpa armigera and Helicoverpa zea.

Taxonomy
The subfamily has been studied extensively. Important works include studies by Hardwick (1965 and 1970) and Matthews (1988).

Distribution and diversity
Heliothinae is a cosmopolitan subfamily of around 400 species. Its species thrive in hot, dry regions of the world, and the subfamily has its highest species diversity in seasonally-arid tropics and subtropics, such as those found Australia, sections of Asia, the southwest region of the United States, and Africa.

Larvae
The subfamily includes both specialist species, of which the larvae feed on only a limited range of plants, and polyphagous generalist species.

The subfamily contains several agricultural pests, including Helicoverpa armigera, Helicoverpa assulta, Helicoverpa zea, Helicoverpa punctigera and Heliothis virescens.

Genera
The subfamily includes the following genera:

 Adisura Moore, 1881
 Aedophron Lederer, 1857 
 Australothis  Matthews, 1991 
 Baptarma  Smith, 1904 
 Chloridea  Duncan & Westwood, 1841 
 Chazaria  Moore, 1881 
 Derrima  Walker, 1858 
 Eutricopis  Morrison, 1875 
 Hebdomochondra  Staudinger, 1879 
 Helicoverpa  Hardwick, 1965 
 Heliocheilus  Grote, 1865 
 Heliolonche  Grote, 1873 
 Heliothis  Ochsenheimer, 1816 
 Heliothodes  Hampson, 1910 
 Melaporphyria  Grote, 1874 
 Micriantha Hampson, 1908 
 Microhelia  Hampson, 1910 
 Periphanes  Hübner, 1821 
 Protadisura Matthews, 1991
 Psectrotarsia Dognin, 1907
 Pyrocleptria  Hampson, 1903
 Pyrrhia  Hübner, 1821 
 Rhodoecia  Hampson, 1910 
 Schinia  Hübner, 1818 
 Stenoecia  Warren, 1911 
 Timora Walker, 1856

Selected former genera
 Erythroecia  Hampson, 1910 
 Masalia Moore, 1881
 Thyreion  Smith, 1891

References 

 Cho, S.; Mitchell, A.; Mitter, C.; Regier, J.; Matthews, M.; Robertson, R. 2008: Molecular phylogenetics of heliothine moths (Lepidoptera: Noctuidae: Heliothinae), with comments on the evolution of host range and pest status. Systematic entomology, 33: 581-594. 
 ICZN 1985: Opinion 1312. Heliothis Ochsenheimer, 1816 (Insecta: Lepidoptera): gender and stem designated. Bulletin of zoological nomenclature, 42: 158-159.  BioStor
 Lafontaine, J.D.; Schmidt, B.C. 2010: Annotated check list of the Noctuoidea (Insecta, Lepidoptera) of North America north of Mexico. ZooKeys, 40: 1-239.

External links

 Subfamily info

 
Noctuidae
Taxa named by Jean Baptiste Boisduval